Kolyuchin Island or Koliuchin Island is a small island in the Chukchi Sea. It is not far from the coast, being only  from the northern shore of the Chukotka Peninsula. Its latitude is 67° 28' N and its longitude 174° 37' W.

It is covered with tundra vegetation. There was a small Chukchi settlement on the southern end of the island called Kolyuchino but as of 1987, there was no village and very rare traces of former human presence such as separate logs and coals.

On the nearby shore there is the settlement of Nutepel'men, located north of the Rypatynonel'gyn Lagoon and south of the Pyngopil'gyn Lagoon. Kolyuchinskaya Bay, further south, is named after Kolyuchin Island. Administratively this island and its surrounding area belongs to the Chukotka Autonomous Okrug of the Russian Federation.

Etymology 
The Russian name of the island comes from a corruption of the Chukchi word Кувлючьин (Kuvlyuch'in) – "round".  In the Chaplino dialect of the Central Siberian Yupik language its name is Кулусик (Kulusik) – "separate ice floe". When the island was visited by James Cook during an expedition, he named it Burney's Island.

History
In September 1933 Soviet ice-breaker Chelyuskin got crushed by pack ice near Kolyuchin Island. The passengers and crew were rescued by air in a dramatic and much publicised operation which made heroes of Captain Vladimir Voronin and expedition leader Otto Schmidt.

The last director of the station, Alexey Spasskin, launched an amateur radio service from the island in 1989 with the call name УЖ1ПОЛ/УА10 and the callsign АС65. The station was ultimately closed in February 1992.

See also
 Chukchi Sea
 List of islands of Russia
 List of research stations in the Arctic

References

External links 
 Armstrong, T., The Russians in the Arctic, London, 1958.
 Early Soviet Exploration: 
 History of Russian Arctic Exploration: 
 Pictures of animals in Kolyuchin Island: 
 Prydatko-Dolin V. Kolyuchin Island Landscapes. My Arctic-in-Art, 2010 (Rus.): 

Islands of the Chukchi Sea
Islands of Chukotka Autonomous Okrug